The following is a list of comets with a very high eccentricity (generally 0.99 or higher) and a period of over 1,000 years that do not quite have a high enough velocity to escape the Solar System. Often, these comets, due to their extreme semimajor axes and eccentricity, will have small orbital interactions with planets and minor planets, most often ending up with the comets fluctuating significantly in their orbital path. These comets probably come from the Oort cloud, a cloud of comets orbiting the Sun from ~10,000 to roughly 50,000 AU. The actual orbit of these comets significantly differs from the provided coordinates. A Solar System barycentric orbit computed at an epoch when the object is located beyond all the planets is a more accurate measurement of its long-term orbit.

List of near-parabolic comets

See also 
 List of comets by type
 List of Halley-type comets
 List of hyperbolic comets
 List of long-period comets
 List of numbered comets
 List of periodic comets

near parabolic